The 15th Secretariat of the All-Union Communist Party (Bolsheviks) was elected by the 1st Plenary Session of the 15th Central Committee, in the aftermath of the 15th Congress.

Full members

Candidate members

References

Secretariat of the Central Committee of the Communist Party of the Soviet Union members
1927 establishments in the Soviet Union
1930 disestablishments in the Soviet Union